Kagami, sometimes spelled Kagamine, may refer to:

People
Takaya Kagami, Japanese manga writer.
Toshio Kagami, chairman CEO of The Oriental Land Company
Kenkichi Kagami, Japanese businessman
Kensuke Kagami, Japanese football player
Kisho Kagami, Japanese baseball player
Yuka Kagami, Japanese freestyle wrestler
Kagami Jūrō, Japanese samurai 
Princess Kagami, Japanese princess and waka poet
Sho Kagami, Japanese football player
Saki Kagami, Japanese former actress
Kagami Yoshimizu, the creator and author of Lucky Star

Fictional characters
Kagami Hiiragi, a character in the anime and manga series Lucky Star
Kagamine Rin/Len, powerful Vocaloid voicebanks
Kagami Tsurugi, a character in the series Miraculous: Tales of Ladybug & Cat Noir  
The last name of Kuro, a character in the manga series Kodomo no Jikan
The last name of Arata, a character in the series Kamen Rider Kabuto

Places
Kagami, Kōchi (Kami), a town located in the former Kami District, Kochi, Japan
Kagami, Kōchi (Tosa), a village located in Tosa District, Kochi, Japan
Kagami Shrine, Shinto shrine located in Karatsu
Kagami, Kumamoto, was a town located in Yatsuhiro District
Kagami Station, is a railway station

Film and television
Muse no Kagami, Japanese television drama series
Muse no Kagami (film), is a 2012 Japanese film
Arei no Kagami, Japanese animation by Leiji Matsumoto

Music
Kagami no Dress, is the 29th single by Noriko Sakai
Sora no Kagami, is the 1997 debut album by Takako Matsu

Other uses
Yata no Kagami, a sacred mirror and one of the Imperial Regalia of Japan
The top braiding surface on a Marudai
Kagami mochi is a traditional Japanese New Year decoration
Kagami biraki is a traditional Japanese ceremony
Azuma Kagami is a Japanese historical chronicle

See also 
 Kagame (surname)

Japanese unisex given names
Japanese-language surnames